Elecraft, Inc. is an American manufacturer of amateur radio ("ham") equipment and kits, based in Watsonville, California. It was founded in 1998 by Wayne Burdick and Eric Swartz.  The company's first product was the K2 transceiver; first prototyped in October 1997.

Products 

The company is most notable for the Elecraft K3 high-performance HF transceiver, a 32-bit DSP based radio covering HF plus the 6-meter VHF band and the 160-meter MF band, introduced in 2008. The reception of the K3 was overwhelmingly positive, with a comprehensive review in QST stating that "The K3, in any of the available configurations, provides a high performance, modular and expandable transceiver that can fill the needs of almost anyone looking for an HF and 6 meter transceiver for home station or portable use". At the time of its introduction, the K3 received the highest Sherwood Engineering ranking of any amateur radio receiver.

Elecraft's product lineup includes a range of QRP CW transceivers, the K2 and K3 all-mode 100W transceiver, KX2 (80m-10m) and KX3 (160m–2m) portable transceivers, linear power amplifiers, two panadapters and a range of accessories including antenna tuners and signal generators.

Many Elecraft products are available both as kits and as ready-built units. All offer expansion options. One K3 option, the K144XV, adds a 10-watt 2-meter internal transceiver. The KX3 can accommodate a single internal VHF transverter module.  The KX3-2M adds the 2-meter band and the KX3-4M adds 4-meter band, both with 2.5-watt RF output. The 2-meter module receives 120-165 MHz, and transmits on the 2-meter amateur radio band. The 4-meter module covers 65–72 MHz. Sensitivity gradually falls off outside the ham bands, though the 2-meter module is capable of receiving 162 MHz weather-band stations and 120 MHz airport tower AM.

The KX3 transceiver is a portable software-defined radio (SDR) transceiver with a full-featured knob-and-button interface. Although it is an SDR transceiver, it does not require a computer connection.

The company's well regarded "K-Line" consists of the K3 transceiver, the KPA500 500W solid-state power amplifier, the KAT500 automatic antenna tuner, and the P3 panadapter.  Also the P3SVGA add-on to the P3 to display the panadapter data on a large screen and the W2 HF/VHF/UHF wattmeter are sometimes considered part of the K-Line.  Most recently Elecraft has introduced the "KX-Line" consisting of the KX2 and KX3 transceivers, the PX3 panadapter, and the KXPA100 100W power amplifier.

In 2015, Elecraft introduced the K3S Transceiver as a direct replacement for the K3 Transceiver.  The K3S is a redesign of the K3 with new or upgraded features, most of which can be back fitted to an older K3.

The K3S is currently ranked 4th in overall performance by Sherwood Engineering company.

In 2017 Elecraft introduced the KPA1500, a 1500 watt (full legal limit) amplifier. The KPA1500 covers the 160 through 6 meter bands. Its most notable feature is a built-in wide-range antenna tuning unit (ATU). The amplifier's power supply is housed in a separate enclosure, allowing the RF deck/control unit to be quite small relative to other full legal limit amplifiers.

Elecraft’s impending release of the K4 transceiver  will replace the K3S.  Elecraft co-founder Eric Swartz discusses the radio in detail on the watersstanton YouTube channel.

References

External links
 www.elecraft.com — Elecraft Inc. site
 www.arrl.org/qst — QST magazine site
 www.arrl.org — American Radio Relay League

Amateur radio companies
Electronics companies of the United States
Technology companies established in 1998
1998 establishments in California
American brands
Radio manufacturers